Ahmed Haji Ali Adami is a Somali politician who served as the Minister of Defence of Somaliland from July 2010 to October 2015. 
He formerly served as the Chairman of National Electoral Commission from 2002 to 2007.

See also

 National Electoral Commission (Somaliland)
 Cabinet of Somaliland
 Ministry of Defence (Somaliland)

References

|-

Living people
Government ministers of Somaliland
Somaliland politicians
Year of birth missing (living people)